Photonics Society of Poland is the largest optics/optoelectronics/photonics organization in Poland. It was transformed from the SPIE Poland Chapter on October 18, 2007 during the Extraordinary General Meeting of the SPIE Poland Chapter members.

PSP is a publisher of Photonics Letters of Poland.

Photonics Letters of Poland 

Photonics Letters of Poland is a peer-reviewed scientific journal published by the Photonics Society of Poland in cooperation with SPIE four times a year. Founded in 2009. The journal has the following divisions of editorial scope: optical technology; information processing; lasers, photonics; environmental optics; and biomedical optics.

See also
European Photonics Industry Consortium

External links
Photonics Society of Poland official web site

PSP publications sites

  Photonics Letters of Poland

Physics societies
Optics institutions
Scientific societies based in Poland
Engineering societies
Scientific organizations established in 2007
2007 establishments in Poland